Sikkal is a small township located between Thiruvarur and Nagapattinam in Tamil Nadu, India. It is 6 km west of Nagapattinam, 18 km east of Thiruvarur. It is famous for its Murugan temple, and one of the most popular festivals is the Sura Samhaaram.

Singaravelan Temple

Navaneetheswarar Temple

References

Villages in Nagapattinam district